Gilfillan is a Scottish surname. Notable people with the name include:

 Bobby Gilfillan (footballer born 1926), Scottish professional footballer
 Bobby Gilfillan (footballer born 1938) (died 2012), Scottish professional footballer
 Calvin Willard Gilfillan (1832–1901), US Congressman
 Ceris Gilfillan (born 1980), British racing cyclist
 Charles Duncan Gilfillan (1831–1902), American lawyer, businessman, and politician
 Rev. George Gilfillan (1813–1878), Scottish poet and critic
 James Gilfillan (1836–1929), Treasurer of the United States
 James Gilfillan (judge) (1829-1894), American judge
 Jock Gilfillan (1898–1976), Scottish professional footballer
 John Bachop Gilfillan (1835–1924), US Congressman
 Rev. Joseph Alexander Gilfillan (1838–1913), Irish-American missionary
 Merrill Gilfillan (born 1945), American poet
 Robert Gilfillan (1798–1850), Scottish songwriter

See also
 Gilfillan, Minnesota, a community in the United States
 Gilfillan Lake, a lake in Minnesota, United States
 Gilfillan Farm, a farm in Pennsylvania, United States